The Zulu golden mole (Amblysomus hottentotus iris) is a golden mole native to Transvaal, South Africa.

References

Afrosoricida
Subspecies